Reconnected may refer to:

ReConnected, a British vocal group
"Reconnected" (song), the seventh track of the 2010 Jessica Mauboy album, Get 'Em Girls
Reconnected Live, a 2010 live album by Yazoo, recorded during the band's Reconnected Tour

See also
Connected (disambiguation)